Jain sculptures or Jain idols are the images depicting Tirthankaras (teaching gods). These images are worshiped by the followers of Jainism. The sculpture can depict any of the twenty-four tirthankaras with images depicting Parshvanatha, Rishabhanatha, or Mahāvīra being more popular. Jain sculptures are an example of Jain art. There is a long history of construction of Jain sculptures. Early examples include Lohanipur Torsos which has been regarded to be from the Maurya period, and images from the Kushan period from Mathura.

Iconography

The Jain idols are males depicted in both sitting and standing postures. The tīrthaṅkaras are represented either Padmasana (seated in yoga posture) or standing in the Kayotsarga posture. Parshvanatha statues are usually depicted with a snake crown on head, Bahubali statues are usually depicted covered with creepers. However, there are a few differences in Digambara and Svetambara depiction of idols. Digambara images are naked without any beautification whereas Svetambara ones are clothed and decorated with temporary ornaments.

Jivantasvami 

The Jivantasvami images represent Lord Mahavira (and in some cases other Tirthankaras) as a prince, with a crown and ornaments. The Jina is represented as standing in the kayotsarga pose.

Examples
Giant rock-cut statues of Jain Tirthankaras are carved in the Gopachal Hill, Gwalior, Madhya Pradesh.

Charans are footprints exclusive to Jain temples. The charan of Tirthankara Rishabhanatha are present at the Badrinath Temple.

Akota Bronzes and Vasantgarh hoard of Gujarat; Hansi hoard of Haryana, Chausa hoard and Aluara bronzes from Bihar.

In Tamil Nadu

Jainism spread here and there all over Tamil Nadu during Sangam Age. One of the Tamil literature, called Paripadal (பரிபாடல்), probably belongs to 3rd century, mentions that there were propelling statues sculptured in stone for different deities in the temple of God Murugan in Thirupparankundram. One among them was Jain statue. Others are Kaaman-Rathi (the deities of Love), Deity Indra  (the king of so-called Heavenly people according to Indian mythology), Agaligai (wife of Saint Gaudham), and Buddha.

Kalugumalai Jain Beds near Madurai belongs to one century latter is to be compared with Thirpparankunram Jain sculpture.
In addition a propelling stone statue of a Jain monk mentioned in Tamil literature is also present.
Cave inscriptions in Brahmi script of Chera kings in Pugalur  probably one century earlier to that of the literature we have taken to our consideration, names some of the Jain Monks vs Yatrur Senkayapan, Pittan, Kotran. Pittan and Kotran are the chieftains of Tamil Nadu also mentioned in Tamil literature more or less to the same period.

In museums
Lohanipur torso found in a central Division of Patna, ancient Pataliputra, dates back to 3rd century BCE. Some of the oldest Jain sculptures excaved at Kankali Tila are in the  Government Museum, Mathura.
Many Jain sculptures are kept in Government Museum, Chennai.

The oldest Jain sculpture in the Metropolitan Museum of Art in New York is of the Siddha Bahubali.

Jain vs Buddhist iconography
A Buddhist image can be in one of several mudras. However the Jain tirthankara images can only be in one of the two format. In Padmasana, the statues of a Jina and a Buddha can be similar. The Buddha statue has folds of the cloth on the upperbody, with cloth behind the left arm, where as the Jina statue is without clothes, unless it is a Shwetambara image which shows "kandora" folds.

Chronological Gallery: Kayotsarga Statues

Chronological  Gallery: Padmasana Statues

Deities Gallery

Colossal statues

See also
 Lohanipur torso
 Akota Bronzes
 Chausa hoard
 Thirakoil
 Jain architecture
 Jain temple

Notes

References

External links 
Guy, John. “Jain Sculpture.” In Heilbrunn Timeline of Art History. New York: The Metropolitan Museum of Art, 2000–. online (January 2012)

Jain art
Indian sculpture